Subcancilla malleti is a species of sea snail, a marine gastropod mollusk, in the family Mitridae, the miters or miter snails.

Description
The length of the shell attains 23. 4 mm.

References

 Keen, A. M. (1971). Sea Shells of Tropical West America. Marine mollusks from Baja California to Peru. ed. 2. Stanford University Press. xv, 1064 pp., 22 pls.

External links
 Petit de la Saussaye S. (1852). Description de coquilles nouvelles. Journal de Conchyliologie. 3: 51-59
 Fedosov A., Puillandre N., Herrmann M., Kantor Yu., Oliverio M., Dgebuadze P., Modica M.V. & Bouchet P. (2018). The collapse of Mitra: molecular systematics and morphology of the Mitridae (Gastropoda: Neogastropoda). Zoological Journal of the Linnean Society. 183(2): 253-337.

malleti
Gastropods described in 1852